The 1842 Chicago Mayoral election  Whig candidate and Former Mayor Benjamin Wright Raymond defeated Democratic candidate Augustus Garrett and Free Soil candidate Henry Smith by a six point margin.

Raymond had previously served a term as mayor after winning the 1839 Chicago mayoral election, and had also previously unsuccessfully sought a second term in the 1840 Chicago mayoral election. By winning the 1842 election, Raymond became the first individual to serve more than one term as mayor of Chicago.

Garrett was a former Chicago alderman.

This was the first Chicago mayoral election in which voters were not required to be freeholders.

Results

Results by ward
As with other mayoral elections of the era, returns in the city's wards heavily matched the partisan makeup of the votes that had been cast in the city's aldermanic election.

References

Mayoral elections in Chicago
Chicago
Chicago
1840s in Chicago